The Ibicuí River (Portuguese, Rio Ibicuí) is a river in Rio Grande do Sul state of southern Brazil. The Ibicuí is 290 km in length, and is the main tributary of the Uruguay River. It is formed by the confluence of the Ibicuí-Mirim River and Santa Maria River at the city of Cacequi. The Ibicuí divides the cities of Uruguaiana and Itaqui.

The river's name, Ibicuí, means "ground of sand" in the Tupi language.

See also
 List of rivers of Rio Grande do Sul

References

External links

Hidrografic Map of the State of Rio Grande do Sul
Bridge over Ibicuí River, constructed by the English in 1888
Information about Ibicuí River

Rivers of Rio Grande do Sul